Events from the year 1946 in Sweden

Incumbents
 Monarch – Gustaf V
 Prime Minister – Per Albin Hansson, Östen Undén (acting), Tage Erlander

Events

19 November – Sweden joins the United Nations.

Births
 1 January – Carl B. Hamilton, economist and politician
 20 June – Lars Vilks, visual artist and activist (died 2021).
 28 August – Anders Gärderud, runner.
 14 September –Anna Westberg, novelist and non-fiction writer (died 2005).
 15 September – Ola Brunkert, drummer (died 2008)
 16 December – benny Andersson, Swedish musician

Deaths

 21 February – Gustaf Kilman, horse rider (born 1882).
 11 March - Carl Lindhagen, politician  (born 1860)
 7 May - Cecilia Milow, author, translator, educator, campaigner and suffragette (born 1856)
 14 June - Kristian Hellström, athlete (born 1880)
 6 October – Per Albin Hansson, prime minister (born 1885)
 16 October - Ebba Bernadotte, morganatic spouse of Prince Oscar Bernadotte and philanthropist (born 1856)

References

 
Years of the 20th century in Sweden